Coleophora texanella is a moth of the family Coleophoridae. It is found in the United States, where it has been recorded from Florida to California, north to New York, Michigan and Ohio, west to Kansas and also in Mexico (Baja California Sur). It has also been recorded from Bermuda and Europe, where it is found in Italy (including Sicily) and in Greece (Zakynthos, the Peloponnesos and Crete).

The wingspan is 10–11 mm. Adults have a gray head, although it whitish laterally. The forewings are brown-gray with some dark scales along the faintly white-lined veins. The fringes are dark gray. The hindwings and fringes are dark gray. There are two generations per year.

The larvae feed on the seeds of Portulaca species, including Portulaca oleracea. They create a trivalved, tubular silken case.

Etymology
Coleophora coxi, which is now considered a synonym, was named after Dr. A. L. Cox, Mook en Middelaar, the Netherlands, who collected the two sexes together and so enabled the researchers to establish their identity.

References

texanella
Moths described in 1878
Moths of North America
Moths of Europe